Subhas Sarkar (born 25 November 1953) is an Indian gynecologist and politician. He was elected to the Lok Sabha, lower house of the Parliament of India from Bankura, West Bengal in the 2019 Indian general election as a member of the Bharatiya Janata Party. He is currently serving as the Union Minister of State in the Ministry of Education (India) in the Second Modi ministry.

Political career

He contested from Bankura as Bharatiya Janata Party candidate in 2019 Indian general election and defeated a veteran politician and Bengal Minister Subrata Mukherjee of All India Trinamool Congress by over 1 lakh votes. On 8 July 2021, he was made the Minister of State for Education during the cabinet reshuffle in the Narendra Modi cabinet.

References

External links
Official biographical sketch in Parliament of India website

Narendra Modi ministry

India MPs 2019–present
Lok Sabha members from West Bengal
Living people
Bharatiya Janata Party politicians from West Bengal
1953 births
People from Bankura district